Hagbart (or Hagbard) Emanuel Berner (12 September 1839 – 24 January 1920) was a Norwegian lawyer, Liberal Party politician and newspaper editor. He was one of Norway's leading liberal progressives of his time. He represented the Liberal Party as a member of parliament from 1880 to 1888, as Auditor General of Norway from 1883 to 1898 and as Burgomaster of Christiania from 1892 to 1912. He was the first editor-in-chief of the liberal newspaper Dagbladet and the co-founder (with Gina Krog) and first president of the Norwegian Association for Women's Rights. In 1882 he introduced the parliamentary act that admitted women to the university.

Background
Berner was born in Sunndal in Møre og Romsdal county, Norway. He was the son of parish priest Ole Christian Berner and Laura Nicoline Collin. The family moved to Akershus in 1850. He married Selma Augusta Hovind in 1871. He was the brother-in-law of both industrialist Hans Mustad and  Hans Gerhard Stub (1849–1931), Bishop of the Norwegian Lutheran Church in America.

Career
Berner graduated as a student in 1858, and as a jurist in 1863. In Christiania he befriended intellectuals such as Ernst Sars and Aasmund Olavsson Vinje, and became politically active and a supporter of the Nynorsk language. He co-founded the publishing house Det Norske Samlaget in 1868, and was its chairman until 1877.

In 1868 he co-founded the newspaper Dagbladet, together with Danish-born author and literary figure, Anthon Bang (1809–1870). He was editor of Dagbladet from 1869 to 1879. The newspaper had close connections to the political movement that later came to be the Liberal Party of Norway.

His demand for a "clean" Norwegian flag, instead of the then-flag with a union badge (popularly known as Sildesalaten), led to political turbulence in 1879. The parliamentary majority voted for the removal of the union badge three times, but was defeated by royal veto twice. Finally, in 1898, the third royal veto was overruled and the union badge was removed from the national and the state flag.

He was elected as a member of the Parliament of Norway in 1879, representing Akershus, and was re-elected in 1882 and 1885. Berner co-founded the Norwegian Association for Women's Rights in 1884, together with Gina Krog, and was the organization's first president. He was Auditor General of Norway from 1883 to 1898, and burgomaster of Kristiania from 1898 to 1912.

References

Norwegian jurists
Norwegian newspaper editors
Auditors general of Norway
Members of the Storting
1839 births
1920 deaths
Norwegian civil servants
Norwegian women's rights activists
Liberal Party (Norway) politicians
Nynorsk
People from Sunndal
Politicians from Oslo
19th-century Norwegian politicians
19th-century Norwegian writers
Norwegian Association for Women's Rights people